Carel van der Velden (born 3 August 1972) is a Dutch retired footballer who is last known to have worked as head coach of SC Everstein in his home country.

Career

Van der Velden started his senior career with Wageningen. In 1996, he signed for Barnsley in the English Football League First Division, where he made ten appearances and scored zero goals.  After that, he played for English clubs Scarborough Athletic and Rushden & Diamonds, and Irish clubs Shelbourne and Sligo Rovers before retiring.

Honours
League of Ireland Premier Division: 
 Shelbourne – 1999–2000
FAI Cup: 
 Shelbourne – 2000

References 

1972 births
Living people
Dutch footballers
Dutch expatriate footballers
Expatriate association footballers in the Republic of Ireland
Association football midfielders
Expatriate footballers in England
Dutch expatriate sportspeople in England
Dutch expatriate sportspeople in Ireland
Shelbourne F.C. players
FC Den Bosch players
SBV Vitesse players
FC Wageningen players
Scarborough Athletic F.C. players
Barnsley F.C. players
Rushden & Diamonds F.C. players
Sligo Rovers F.C. players
League of Ireland players